Dederstedt is a village and a former municipality in the Mansfeld-Südharz district, Saxony-Anhalt, Germany. On 1 September 2010, it became part of the municipality Seegebiet Mansfelder Land.

References

Former municipalities in Saxony-Anhalt
Seegebiet Mansfelder Land